

Infantry
1st Delaware Infantry Regiment
2nd Delaware Infantry Regiment
3rd Delaware Infantry Regiment
4th Delaware Infantry Regiment
5th Delaware Infantry Regiment
6th Delaware Infantry Regiment
7th Delaware Infantry Regiment
8th Delaware Infantry Regiment
9th Delaware Infantry Regiment
Sterling's Infantry Company

Cavalry
1st Delaware Cavalry Regiment
Milligan's Independent Cavalry Company

Artillery
1st (Nields' Independent) Battery, Light Artillery
Ahl's Heavy Artillery Company

References
The Civil War Archive

See also
Lists of American Civil War Regiments by State

 
Civil War
Delaware